Rugiloricus  is a genus of marine organisms of the phylum Loricifera and the family Pliciloricidae, described by Higgins & Kristensen in 1986.

Species

References

External links 

 Integrated Taxonomic Information System (ITIS): Rugiloricus Higgins and Kristensen, 1986 Taxonomic Serial No.: 722180
 uBio: Rugiloricus Higgins & Kristensen 1986 NamebankID:4581983

Loricifera
Protostome genera